Paul "Hook" Wallace (November 1, 1925 – September 23, 1998) was an American professional basketball player. He played in the National Basketball League for the Toledo Jim White Chevrolets for one game during the 1941–42 season.

References 

1925 births
1998 deaths
American men's basketball players
Basketball players from Philadelphia
Guards (basketball)
Toledo Jim White Chevrolets players
Toledo Rockets men's basketball players